Grand Slam: Studio Sessions is a compilation album by Irish rock band Grand Slam, released in 2002 (see 2002 in music), but recorded in 1984 (see 1984 in music).

The first disc of this double-disc album is a collection of Grand Slam's songs, chosen by the keyboardist Mark Stanway. The second disc is a collection of demos, and two extracts from a radio interview with Phil Lynott in Dublin in 1984.

Track listing
Disc one
 "Nineteen" (Phil Lynott) – 4:02
 "Crime Rate" (Lynott, Mark Stanway) – 6:14
 "Sisters of Mercy" (Lynott, Stanway) – 6:37
 "Whiter Shade of Pale / Like a Rolling Stone" (Gary Brooker, Keith Reid / Bob Dylan) – 5:46
 "Military Man" (Lynott, Stanway) – 6:16
 "Harlem" (Lynott, Doish Nagle) – 4:11
 "Gay Boys" (Lynott, Stanway) – 3:58
 "Breakdown" (Lynott, Stanway) – 3:31
 "Look In These Eyes" (Lynott) – 3:55
 "She Cries" (Lynott) – 4:02

Disc two
 Radio Interview with Phil Lynott, Dublin 1984 – 8:02
 "Crime Rate" (Demo) (Lynott, Stanway) – 6:10
 Interview (Part 2) – 9:08
 "Nineteen" (Demo) (Lynott, Stanway) – 4:00
 "Slam" (Lynott, Stanway) – 7:15
 "Sisters of Mercy" (Alternative Mix) (Lynott, Stanway) – 7:01

Singles
Whiter Shade Of Pale/Like A Rolling Stone – CD (2002)

Personnel
Grand Slam
Phil Lynott – lead vocals, bass guitar
Laurence Archer – lead guitar
Doish Nagle – rhythm guitar, backing vocals
Mark Stanway – keyboards, piano
Robbie Brennan – drums
Brian Downey - drums
Technical
Sue Peters - photography 
Martin Walker - re-mastering  
Compiled and produced by Mark Stanway

2002 compilation albums
Compilation albums by Irish artists
Grand Slam (band) albums